TNA Wrestling Impact! (styled TNA Wrestling iMPACT!) is a mobile professional wrestling video game released by Namco Networks in 2011. It is based on the professional wrestling promotion Total Nonstop Action Wrestling (TNA). Unlike TNA Wrestling, the previous mobile game based on TNA, TNA Wrestling Impact features 3D graphics and is more action-oriented than its predecessor. The game was released for both iOS and Android devices. The game has received mixed reviews, with criticism directed at the game's presentation and controls. It is no longer available for download on the iTunes App Store or Google Play Store.

Gameplay 

The game makes use of the touch screen of iOS and Android devices by providing a virtual control pad for movement and three buttons for grapples, attacks and other in-ring actions. The actions available to the player are determined by the current in-ring situation - for example, pressing the attack button near a downed wrestler may result in a stomp to the opponent's closest body part. The game also features an option allowing players to create an original wrestler.

Players can enter career mode to contend for one of three TNA titles: the TNA World Heavyweight Championship, the TNA X Division Championship or the TNA World Tag Team Championship. Match types include cage matches and submission matches.

Reception 

The iOS version received "mixed" reviews according to the review aggregation website Metacritic. Harry Slater of Pocket Gamer criticized the pace as well as the repetitiveness of the game. However, he described the game as fun and as a good representation of pro wrestling as a whole.

See also

List of licensed wrestling video games

References

External links

Bandai Namco games
2011 video games
2011 in professional wrestling
Android (operating system) games
Impact Wrestling video games
IOS games
Video games developed in the United States